Stephen William Gibbons (11 September 1949 – July 2022) was an Australian politician who served as an Australian Labor Party member of the Australian House of Representatives from March 1998 until August 2013 representing the Division of Bendigo, Victoria. 

He was born in Melbourne. He attended Golden Square Primary School and Kangaroo Flat Secondary College in Bendigo.  He became an apprentice to a motor mechanic. He worked in auto part wholesaling and packaging industries. 

He was a trade union official, small business proprietor and researcher and adviser to the Victorian Leader of the Opposition, John Brumby, before entering politics.

First elected to represent the Bendigo electorate in 1998, he was re-elected in 2001, 2004, 2007 and 2010. In August 2011, Gibbons announced his intention to retire from parliament at the next election.

Gibbons died in July 2022, at the age of 72.

References

External links

1949 births
2022 deaths
Australian Labor Party members of the Parliament of Australia
Labor Left politicians
Members of the Australian House of Representatives
Members of the Australian House of Representatives for Bendigo
21st-century Australian politicians
20th-century Australian politicians
Politicians from Melbourne